Lower Tamar Lake is located on the Devon-Cornwall border, in England, near Thurdon.

It was constructed in the 1820s to supply water to the Bude Canal. It is now a nature reserve. It is also a popular fishing lake.

The reservoir has been formed by damming the River Tamar. To the north (upstream) is the newer Upper Tamar Lake, a reservoir used for public water supply.

The county boundary originally ran along the (natural) route of the River Tamar, but was re-aligned along a (now disused) re-routing of the river to the reservoir's west side, placing the lake in Devon.

There are several short walks at the lake, such as the aqueduct trail. This is a path following the canal that reaches a small building showing the history of the lake. Another walk that can be taken is towards upper lake. this route is also popular for cyclists.

References

External links
Bude Canal and Harbour Society 1904 map showing the reservoir, the then route of the Tamar and the feeder to the Bude Canal

Environment of Cornwall
Environment of Devon
Reservoirs in Devon
Reservoirs in Cornwall
River Tamar